Jorge Carral Armella (born September 2, 1983) is a  Mexican former swimmer, who specialized in long-distance freestyle events. He held numerous national age group records in the 400 and 1500 m freestyle, and later represented Mexico at the 2000 Summer Olympics.

Carral competed in a long-distance freestyle double, as a 17-year-old, at the 2000 Summer Olympics in Sydney. He posted FINA B-standards of 3:56.20 (400 m freestyle) and 15:33.66 (1500 m freestyle) from the Mexican Youth Olympic Festival in Hermosillo. On the first day of the Games, Carral placed twenty-eighth in the 400 m freestyle. Swimming in heat three, he held off New Zealand's Jonathan Duncan by 0.18 of a second to take a fourth spot in 3:58.34. Nearly a week later, in the 1500 m freestyle, Carral challenged seven other swimmers in the same heat, including top favorites Ricardo Monasterio of Venezuela and Spyridon Gianniotis of Greece. He finished the program's longest race in sixth place and thirty-first overall at 15:43.03, almost ten seconds off his Mexican record and entry time.

References

1983 births
Living people
Mexican male swimmers
Olympic swimmers of Mexico
Swimmers at the 2000 Summer Olympics
Mexican male freestyle swimmers
Swimmers from Mexico City